The following outline is provided as an overview of and topical guide to the Collectivity of Saint Martin:

The Collectivity of Saint Martin is an overseas collectivity of France located in the Leeward Islands of the Lesser Antilles archipelago in the Caribbean Sea.  It came into being on February 22, 2007, encompassing the northern parts of the island of Saint Martin and neighbouring islets, the largest of which is Île Tintamarre. The southern part of the island, Sint Maarten, is a constituent country of the Kingdom of the Netherlands.

General reference

 Pronunciation:
 Common English country name:  Saint Martin
 Official English country name:  The French Overseas Collectivity of Saint Martin
 Common endonym: Saint-Martin
 Official endonym: Collectivité de Saint-Martin
 Adjectival(s): Saint-Martinoise
 Demonym(s): Saint-Martinoise
 ISO country codes:  MF, MAF, 663
 ISO region codes:  See ISO 3166-2:MF
 Internet country code top-level domain:  .mf

Geography of Saint Martin 

 Saint Martin is: an island, and an overseas collectivity of France
 Location:
 Northern Hemisphere and Western Hemisphere
 North America (though not on the mainland)
 Atlantic Ocean
 North Atlantic
 Caribbean
 Antilles
 Lesser Antilles
 Leeward Islands
 French West Indies
 Saint Martin Island (which it shares with the Netherlands Antilles)
 Time zone:  Eastern Caribbean Time (UTC-04)
 Extreme points of Saint Martin
 High:  Pic Paradis 
 Low:  Caribbean Sea 0 m
 Land boundaries:   15 km
 Coastline:  Caribbean Sea
 Population of Saint Martin:
 Area of Saint Martin:
 Atlas of Saint Martin

Natural geographical features of Saint Martin 
 Anguilla Channel
Islands of Saint Martin (France):
Northern portion of the island of Saint Martin
Caye Verte
Crowl Rock
Grand Îlet
Île Tintamarre
Petite Clef
Pinel
Rocher de l’Anse Marcel
 Rivers of Saint Martin
 Simpson Bay Lagoon

Government and politics of Saint Martin 

Politics of the Collectivity of Saint Martin
 Form of government:
 Head of state: President of France
 Head of government: President of the Territorial Council, Frantz Gumbs
 Cabinet of Saint Martin: The Territorial Council of the Collectivity of Saint Martin
 Capital of Saint Martin: Marigot
 Political parties in the Collectivity of Saint Martin
 Elections:
 2007 Saint Martin Territorial Council election

International organization membership 
The Collectivity of Saint Martin is a member of:
Universal Postal Union (UPU)
World Federation of Trade Unions (WFTU)

History of Saint Martin 

History of Saint Martin
 French colonization of the Americas
 Arrondissement of Saint-Martin-Saint-Barthélemy
 Treaty of Concordia

Culture of Saint Martin 

Culture of Saint Martin
 French America
 Language in Saint Martin
 French
 Virgin Islands Creole
 National symbols of Saint Martin
 Coat of arms of the Collectivity of Saint Martin
 Flag of Saint Martin
 National anthem of Saint Martin
 Scouting and Guiding in Guadeloupe and Saint Martin
 Sport in Saint Martin
 Football in Saint Martin
 Comité de Football des Îles du Nord
 Saint-Martin Championships
 Saint Martin national football team
 Rugby union in Saint Martin
 World Heritage Sites in Saint Martin: None

Economy and infrastructure of Saint Martin 

Currency of Saint Martin: Euro (see also: Euro topics)
ISO 4217: EUR

Infrastructure of Saint Martin 

 Communications in Saint Martin
 .gp
 .mf
 Transportation in Saint Martin
 Airports in Saint Martin
 L'Espérance Airport

See also 

Saint Martin
List of international rankings
Outline of France
Outline of geography
Outline of North America
Outline of South America

References

External links 

 Travel and tourism

 About Saint Martin Tourist Guide
 Dutch St. Maarten — St. Maarten Tourist Bureau
 French Saint Martin — Saint Martin Tourist Office
 Princess Juliana International Airport, St. Maarten — Official site

 Organizations
 Birds of St. Martin - by Eric Dubois-Millot, Action Nature.

 News and media
 The Daily Herald (St. Maarten)|The Daily Herald— Daily newspaper from St. Maarten
 LE FAXinfo — Other daily newspaper from Saint Martin (in French)

Saint Martin
 1